Elizabeth "Effy" Stonem is a fictional character in the television series Skins, played by Kaya Scodelario. She appears in all of the first four series, as well as the seventh series, and appears in the most episodes (27). Kaya Scodelario was included in Entertainment Weeklys 2009 "Summer Must List", being named "Bad Girl" for her portrayal of Effy. She was included in AfterEllen.com's Top 50 Favorite Female TV Characters.

Characterisation

Effy was born on June 20, 1992, and is Tony Stonem's runaway sister and one of the few people he truly cares about. She usually goes to social events with her own group of friends, leaving Tony uninvolved in most of her social life, though he helped her on more than one occasion to deceive their parents as to her whereabouts. The official website refers to "Tony's little sister and her shadowy ways." Until the first season's eighth episode, "Effy", she does not speak at all, instead sitting silently in the background of the scenes in which she appears, usually with a cold stare or a wry smile (a trademark of hers). In her first speaking appearance, she describes how she feels toward others:

Tony sarcastically comments that she is participating in a sponsored silence, and when asked by Michelle why she never speaks, she simply doesn't answer. On her blog she reveals that her parents had her see a counselor for withholding speech, but that proved ineffective. Various psychologists who have studied Effy's character and personality have come to the conclusion she may have suffered from selective mutism, in Generation 1 and 2, something that affected her in the later seasons. From Effy's blog, she was likely influenced by silent film actress Clara Bow, who she profusely references as the "It" Girl from It, which was released in 1927. Her family dysfunctions the times we see them together are also thought to give Effy this trait. 

It is after Tony's life-threatening accident in the finale of the first series, Effy begins speaking again. After expressing her feelings of misanthropy to Tony, however, her brother snidely remarks to her that she "doesn't fool [him]", suggesting that she is more vulnerable than her guarded and apparent aloofness may lead others to believe. She also proves to be perceptive and sly, as she almost single-handedly mends both Tony and Michelle's and Sid and Cassie's romantic relationships, a task that seemed essentially hopeless.

In the third series Effy became a central character, developing into something of a femme fatale and the rebel of Roundview College. Despite her usual composure, she goes "off the rails" after her parents' separation and the love triangle between her and her classmates Freddie McClair and James Cook, once close friends before their rivalry over Effy pushed them apart. Of the two, she loves Freddie more, but she is afraid of dealing with real love, so she instead goes after Cook. Her mother, Anthea Stonem, justifies Effy's behavior to JJ Jones by saying that "showing her cards scares her to death". Effy's state is also exacerbated by Tony's absence, as he had proved to be a stabilizing force in her life, as also shown in a blog entry by Effy posted on the official Skins website. In her eponymous episode in season three, Effy is depicted at her most fragile: she appears completely withdrawn from the world, participates in mindless sex with Cook and takes uncharacteristically little care with her appearance, appearing tired and fatigued. These factors hint at the development of Effy's depression, which will descend into full-blown psychosis in the next series.

In the fourth series, she returns to Bristol after being away in Venice for the summer. She and Freddie begin their relationship again deciding that she loves him, thus letting go of Cook for good. She begins to have psychotic episodes and delusional symptoms and Freddie realizes that Effy has developed psychotic depression. She attempts suicide but Freddie, foreseeing this, saves her and she is taken to hospital and later, institutionalized. Anthea tells Freddie that they both need to be there to rebuild Effy, but Freddie tells her that only she will be there for her, seemingly letting go of Effy. Though they reconcile, when she leaves treatment in her centric episode, it is shown she is being abused by her obsessive psychiatrist and his unconventional hypnotic methods for treating her; Dr. Foster attempts to make Effy "forget" her friends. At the site of Tony's accident, Effy suffers another breakdown and, in traffic, attempts suicide once again. When Freddie confronts Dr. Foster about Effy's treatment, the doctor kills him. In the finale of season four, Effy is once again out of treatment, and even following Freddie's mysterious disappearance is secure in that he loved her.

Effy is one of few characters in the series who have broken the fourth wall, looking straight at the camera and commenting or smirking in some episodes; another person to do this (and probably the most obvious) was Rich (Generation 3) in Series 6 episode 10 "Everyone (finale)", looking straight at the camera, saying the word "bye", signifying the end of Skins in its entirety, aside from Series 7 being a 6 episode redux.

On her official Skins page, Effy claims she is distantly related to the 18th-century French aristocrat Cecile DeLacroix, who was beheaded during the French Revolution. She also says her favorite smell is petrol, and describes a peculiar talent of being able to pick up objects with her toes. Her favorite film is E.T.. Her best friend is odd girl Pandora Moon, who despite their differences, "gives the detached and cool Effy a heart".

Character history
Effy was born on June 20, 1992 to parents Anthea (Morwenna Banks) and Jim Stonem (Harry Enfield).

Series 1
In "Tony", Effy is seen one morning briefly walking home at the beginning of the episode, apparently from partying the night before. Her brother Tony distracts her father so that she can sneak back into the house, a routine they are both clearly familiar with.
 
In "Effy", Tony is forced to care about someone other than himself for once when Effy – one of the only people he cares about – disappears during a night of partying with a boy named Spencer (played by Tom Payne). After taking various drugs, Spencer leads Effy to a party, where Josh Stock injects her with stolen clean pharmaceuticals. When Effy overdoses, Josh tells Tony that he will only let him take her to the hospital if Tony has sex with his unconscious sister, which Josh demands in revenge for Tony scheming against his relationship with Michelle. After Tony begs for forgiveness, Josh lets them go, and Tony rushes to the hospital with Effy and Sid Jenkins, where Effy is told that she will be fine. During this episode Effy shows some tendencies similar to an arsonist, setting certain objects alight with her cigarette lighter.
 
In the series finale, we learn that Effy's parents have moved her to the private school in the aftermath of her drug episode. More layers to her character appear as she derides Tony verbally as a wanker for his treatment of ex-girlfriend Michelle, who had come to her previously in an attempt to understand Tony. She witnesses as Tony is hit by a bus, and screams in horror, crying silently as the finale takes place.

Series: 2
In the second series, we learn that Effy has now begun to speak openly, at least amongst her family and presumably among others as well. She also continues to party, as seen in the first episode of the second series, despite the events of "Effy" last series where both she and Tony were put through a traumatic experience.

In the sixth episode "Tony", it becomes clear that she is looking after Tony since his accident, where she is seen comforting him from his nightmares by reading him Greek myths. She also speaks to Michelle and Sid, but is fairly unfriendly with both of them.

In this series' Effy-centric episode, it is revealed that Effy and Tony's father is on a business trip in France while their mother stays at home each day, depressed and taking Tony's medication. Effy on the other hand has taken on the role of a parental figure somewhat, where she is seen washing and drying her and Tony's clothes (albeit ineptly), and watching after her mother.

At school Effy's art teacher appoints Effy to the task of helping new girl Pandora, and explains that she must do well on her GCSE Art coursework or else she'll be expelled. Although Effy clearly objects to the former, she allows Pandora to follow her around, and even takes her home with her. Back at home Tony receives a parcel from Michelle, which is actually the watch he gave her for her birthday, prompting him to become further frustrated with Sid. Sid explains to Effy his problems, in which she agrees that in exchange for doing her GCSE Art coursework, she will sort out Sid's struggling social enterprises; specifically concerning his love for the estranged Cassie Ainsworth.

Effy, with Pandora in tow, picks up weed at Cassie's where she inquires about her relationship with Sid, but otherwise doesn't probe the subject. Effy is later seen taking the drugs to a club, where she sells them and is also seen by Tony selling Michelle's watch, prompting him to be angered with her. It is revealed later that Effy didn't sell it, but instead had it repaired and sent back to Michelle with the word "forever" engraved in it, softening Michelle enough to speak to Tony again. As for Sid, Effy sends an acquaintance of hers called Jake to Cassie's – knowing the chances that they would sleep together – and takes a series of photos through the window. She scatters the photos around Sid's sleeping form, prompting him to finally confront Cassie, where the two subsequently make up.

At school, Effy doesn't use Sid's artwork he created for her (she lets Pandora use it), but explains to her teacher that her GCSE Art coursework is conceptual, in which she used an array of emotions – referring to her recent experiences helping others mend their relationships. At the end of the episode, Effy's father arrives home to a clean house, and his wife in an elegant state, all presumably done by Effy.

In the finale of the second series, "Final Goodbyes", Effy is seen in the final shot before the credits, smirking at the camera and smiling while lying under Tony's duvet cover, foreshadowing her presence as the lead character in the third series.

Series 3
In the first episode of the series, Effy catches the eye of best friends Freddie, Cook and JJ on her first day at Roundview College. When Freddie attempts to engage in conversation with Effy, flirtatiously suggesting possibly more than a friendship, she warns him that his best friends Cook and JJ want the same, which will likely complicate things. However, after his insistence, she then proposes a challenge by giving him a list of all the things they're not supposed to do in school — such as sniffing glue, smoking weed, arson, porn, and sex in school — and says whoever completes the list first will get an opportunity to "get to know" her. By the end of the day Cook is the only one to have completed Effy's challenge, with the exceptions of sex and drugs in school. Effy excuses herself from class, prompting Cook to follow, where they light up a spliff and the two have sex in the school nurse's office.

In the following episode, "Cook", Effy gets to know her new classmates better while celebrating Cook's birthday, and in the third episode "Thomas", her suspicion that her mother is having an affair is confirmed when she catches her post-coitus with her father's boss. In the following episode "Pandora", her father leaves her and her mother, so Effy copes by getting trashed at Pandora's girls-only pajama party, despite Pandora's earlier rules that drinking, drugs, and boys would not be tolerated. When Effy returns the next morning, presumably to apologise or comfort Pandora for her actions, she discovers that Pandora and Cook slept together. Though Effy immediately confronts her, Pandora uses the opportunity to stand up for herself and tells Effy she does not put enough effort into their friendship (she has, thus far, demonstrated herself to be somewhat selfish), for which Effy does not argue.

In "Freddie", Effy rebuffs Freddie's suggestion that they'd "be good together" by claiming that she would merely break his heart. Later, Freddie expresses his feelings to her in greater depth where the two share a passionate kiss, however Effy returns to Cook. In "Naomi", although there is apparent tension between Effy and Freddie, she and Pandora seem to be on better terms with one another. In "JJ", JJ, Freddie and Cook's mutual friend, who has been encouraged by Emily, angrily confronts Effy for her part in destroying the once-strong friendship he, Freddie and Cook shared. Effy, seeing the impact she had had, is apologetic and, although she cannot guarantee that she will stop, she expresses sentiment that she would like to become his friend after he admits that he loves her too, and is somewhat hurt when he refuses. Naomi later points out that Effy is in love with Freddie, although Effy feebly denies it.

In her central episode it is apparent that Effy has "gone off the rails" as stated by her in the previous episode. Though she is prepared to break up with Cook — which she does without informing him — and confront Freddie with her feelings, she is discouraged by Freddie's new relationship with Katie. When the group goes camping in an area of the woods known as Gobblers End, the uninvited Cook shows up and bitterly reveals secrets, including that he and Pandora have apparently been sleeping together behind Effy's back. Under the influence of shrooms, Effy flees from the clearing where they are camping and into the woods where she is attacked by a jealous and insecure Katie, who pins her down and spits on her before attempting to choke her, prompting Effy to pick up a rock and strike Katie in self-defense. Afterward, Effy is comforted when she and Freddie have sex for the first time, however the next morning when Katie is learned to be missing, Effy becomes extremely anxious. Eventually, Katie is found after a phone call Effy makes and is taken to the hospital, where Freddie and others learn what happened and turn against Effy for abandoning Katie in the woods and for causing her to need nine stitches in her head. Effy blacks out, only to awake in a car driven by Cook, who doesn't know where they are or where they are going, only that the two of them are going together. A full moon appears in Effy's central episodes, both in season 3 and 4; this is a connection to Effy's dark state of mind and her depressive disorder.

It is learned in the finale that Cook has been bringing Effy to "one small, shitty town after another" for weeks, and Effy is becoming gradually more dissatisfied with this seemingly aimless wandering. Cook, however, tells her that this is the town where his father lives. While Cook is content to end their journey here, Effy grows worried for Cook when she sees how his father manipulates him, prompting her to call Freddie for help — and telling him that she loves him shortly before hanging up. When Freddie and JJ arrive, they decide that the fate of the boys' relationships with Effy should be decided by the small town's race. JJ, who wins the race, takes charge and demands that they solve their problems once and for all, forcing both boys to admit that they each love Effy and telling her that she must choose between them. Although Effy doesn't say anything, her "look says it all" when her gaze lingers over Freddie, prompting Cook to leave in a fury. When Freddie and Effy are alone, they make up and have sex. The following morning Effy, Freddie, Cook, and JJ begin their journey home.

Series 4
Over the summer, Effy goes with her mother to Italy, breaking up with Freddie due to the guilt she feels from the pain she caused Katie and Cook and does not contact anyone. In "Thomas", Effy does not come to the first day of school and the others assume she is still in Italy. It is revealed at the end of the first episode that she is actually back in England, and that she is with Pandora at her house comforting her after Thomas shows up, who tried to get back with her after having cheated on her.

In "Emily", Effy returns to college, sits next to Freddie and reveals that it's him she was thinking about all summer. She then hugs Cook while Freddie watches. Later at a party, Effy is dancing with Freddie and kisses him. Cook sees this and lashes out at fellow party-goer Shankey and headbutts JJ without realizing who he has hurt. Effy and Freddie see him fighting and leave.

In the following episode "Cook", Effy and Freddie kiss again and are overseen by Cook, who has become expelled and eventually arrested when admitting to selling drugs that led to a suicide. Effy comes to see Cook in prison and tells him she loves Freddie. She admits that love is a "headfuck", but that she is enjoying it nevertheless, which Cook seems to understand.

In Freddie's episode, Effy's mother has gone on an extended vacation, leaving Effy all alone. Thus Freddie and Effy stay there, doing drugs, heavy partying and having sex. Eventually, Effy begins acting erratically, cutting out pictures of death and pasting them to her mother's bedroom wall while mentioning "creatures" coming for her. She decides to throw a "goodbye party", thus freaking much of the gang out. Freddie knocks on Effy's door three times and shakes the doorknob before she finally lets him in. When Freddie enters, he sees her hiding under the bed, visibly shaken. She tells him that he is the only one she can trust.

After Freddie clears the party out, Cook remains. However, when seeing him, Effy begins to freak out, yelling at him to leave and at Freddie to make him. Freddie starts to think that Effy is developing psychosis as well as manic episodes; something his mother also dealt with. He asks his grandfather for advice and attempts to help her. When he takes Effy to a calm field, she says that the creatures are coming for her and that she used to be stronger (thus able to fight them off) but being with Freddie had made her susceptible and "weak" to them. She sees a group of people walking toward them and freaks out, believing them to be the monsters she spoke to Freddie about. Freddie scares them off. At her insistence, Freddie drives Effy home where he sees her mother talking to a police officer. Not wanting to give up on Effy yet, Freddie turns around and begins to take Effy somewhere else.

On the way, they run into the Judgment Day parade. The number of people in demonic looking costumes begins to freak Effy out. She blames Freddie and runs away. Freddie tries to follow with the help of Cook, but loses sight of her. Katie, who is dancing on a float, sees a distraught Effy and rescues her, and calls Freddie over to take care of her. Freddie and Katie take her to visit his grandfather.

While Freddie talks to his grandfather, Katie and Effy wait in the hall. Shortly, Katie enters the room, anxious because Effy won't come out of the bathroom. Freddie, distraught once he realizes Effy's been left alone, runs the bathroom she went to. Kicking the door open, he sees Effy lying on the floor unconscious with her wrists slashed. She is taken to hospital to be treated. In the hospital, Effy tells Freddie to go away. Later, Freddie talks to Effy's mother Anthea. She says that Effy needs both of them now. Freddie replies that she is going to have to take care of Effy alone, and runs off. He then goes back to Effy's home, rips all of her "death" pictures off the wall, and burns them in a bonfire outside. Cook shows up and tells Freddie not to give up on Effy.

Since Effy's suicide attempt, she has been admitted to a psychiatric hospital, under the supervision and counselling of her psychiatrist John T. Foster. As she is permitted to leave, albeit with conditions from John, she decides to visit Freddie, in which she confirms she only has love for him, and "that is all". However, at a celebration party where all the other characters are celebrating their A levels, Effy suddenly states that she is finished and is saying goodbye to everyone - including Freddie.

Over the course of the episode Effy's condition deteriorates to the point where she completely forgets who she is, and who her friends are, transforming her into a whole new person. Cook notices this and after a brief chasing scene Effy demands to be taken back to Freddie. As Cook does so he notices a duffel bag; hinting towards Freddie's near escape, the two talk and Cook leaves implying he is finished with chasing Effy. Effy is once again institutionalised, although refusing to go back under the supervision of John as it is apparent he has been using hypnotic methods to cause her to forget everything about her past and life. After a brief scuffle with Freddie, John exits hastily, and Effy states that Freddie deserves better than her. Freddie dismisses her comment and she falls asleep holding Freddie's hand and telling him she loves him over and over.

The next morning John invites Freddie to his home where Freddie once again demands that John leave Effy alone. When Freddie tries to leave, the door is locked and John, brandishing a baseball bat, reveals that he wants Effy for himself, explaining "she really does love you, you know." Freddie is heard trying to reason with John, who begins to beat him mercilessly. After a few more yells and blood splatting onto the window the counsellor continues beating the now silent Freddie.

In the finale episode of series 4 we see Effy in hospital and recovering well once more. She is concerned over Freddie's sudden departure and believes that her condition scared him off. After she's seen in hospital with Pandora and Katie, Cook finds her, now out of hospital, in Freddie's shed. She shares her concerns and her feeling of rejection with him. He gives her Freddie's notebook in which Freddie declares his love for her on every page. The episode ends with her being comforted in the knowledge of Freddie's feelings for her and celebrating his birthday with all the gang in his shed.

Series 7
In the two-part episode, "Fire", set three years after the ending of Series 4, Effy, now 21, is living in London with Naomi, with whom she now has a close relationship, and working a dead-end job as a receptionist in a high-profile hedge fund. In the years since her last appearance, she has become more mature, principled and assertive. Effy eventually becomes a stock trader with some help of her friend, Dominic (Craig Roberts), who claims to be in love with her. After achieving success through illicit information provided to her by Dominic, she pursues a relationship with Jake (Kayvan Novak), her wealthy boss, and begins to live the high life. Unfortunately, this is short-lived when the Financial Services Authority receives a tip-off, and evidence, that her success was the result of insider trading, and Jake places the blame squarely with her (although he had actually encouraged her to do it). To make matters worse, her personal life is shattered when Naomi is diagnosed with terminal cancer, and Effy finds herself having to deal with both the possibility of going to prison and the pain of losing Naomi. Eventually, after managing to get Emily back to London to ensure that Naomi's last days will be spent with her beloved girlfriend at her side, she agrees, after some sympathy from Victoria, Jake's ex-girlfriend and the FSA agent investigating Effy, to sign a confession that will name Jake and reduce her own prison sentence. Effy's story ends with Effy being placed into a police car to be taken into custody, her trademark wry smile crossing her face.

References

External links
Effy Stonem on the official E4 Skins site
Effy Stonem Character Blog on E4 Skins site
 Effy Stonem on Myspace
Effy Stonem interview on TV.com

Skins (British TV series) characters
Fictional English people
Television characters introduced in 2007
Fictional characters with bipolar disorder
Fictional attempted suicides
Fictional cannabis users
Teenage characters in television
British female characters in television
Female characters in television